Slovakia has around 14 open-air museums, or skanzens, showcasing the country's folk traditions, architecture, and economic history. The museums include examples of traditional buildings and furnishings, and many offer demonstrations of traditional handicrafts. The largest open-air museum is the Slovak Village Open Air Museum in Martin.

List of museums
 Archeoskanzen Havránok - Archeological Park Havránok
A dedicated archaeological park beside the Liptovská Mara dam.
 Slovenské banské múzeum - Slovak Mining Museum, Open-Air Exhibition, Banská Štiavnica
Located in Banská Štiavnica, a designated UNESCO World Heritage Site in central Slovakia, it allows access in the old gold and silver mine.
 Čičmany Museum Village
Many of the village houses are built in the traditional style.
 Hornonitriansky banský skanzen – Baňa Cigeľ
Located in Sebedražie near Prievidza, it allows access in the brown coal mine.
 Expozícia ľudovej architektúry Rusínov - Ukrajincov - Exhibition of Folk Architecture of Ruthenians - Ukrainians, Svidník
 Ľubovnianske múzeum, národopisná expozícia v prírode (skanzen) - Ľubovňa Museum, Ethnographic Open-Air Collection, Stará Ľubovňa
Part of the Ľubovňa Castle complex in northern Slovakia.
 Múzeum ľudovej architektúry, Národopisná expozícia Bardejovské Kúpele - Museum of Folk Architecture, Ethnographic Open-Air Collection, Bardejov Spa
Part of the Bardejov Spa complex.
 Múzeum slovenskej dediny - Museum of the Slovak Village, Martin
Slovakia's largest open-air museum, located in Martin.
 Múzeum liptovskej dediny - Museum of the Liptov Village, Pribylina
Located in Pribylina, in the Liptov area.
 Vlkolínec Museum Village
Features many traditional buildings and is also a UNESCO World Heritage Site
 Múzeum kysuckej dediny - Museum of the Kysuce Village, Vychylovka
Located in Vychylovka, the site also features a restored forest logging railway.
 Múzeum oravskej dediny - Museum of the Orava Village, Zuberec – Brestová
Located in Zuberec, a 20-hectare site housing numerous traditional buildings relocated to the site for preservation from throughout the Orava region.
 Slovenské poľnohospodárske múzeum - Slovak Agricultural Museum, Nitra
Located in Nitra.
 Vihorlatské múzeum, expozícia ľudovej architektúry a bývania - Vihorlat Museum, Exhibition of the Folk Architecture and Dwelling
Located in Humenné, north-east Slovakia.

Gallery

See also

 List of museums in Slovakia

External links
 

 
Archaeological sites in Slovakia
Museums in Slovakia
Architecture in Slovakia
Slovak folklore
Vernacular architecture